Hecato may refer to:

Hecato of Rhodes, a Stoic philosopher
hecato (unit prefix), an archaic metric unit prefix